The American Restatement of Torts, Second, is a treatise issued by the American Law Institute. It summarizes the general principles of common law United States tort law. The volumes covering torts are part of the second Restatements of the Law series.

It includes four volumes, with the first two published in 1965, the third in 1977 and the last in 1979.

Section 402A of this Restatement, discussing strict liability for defective products, is by far the most widely cited section of any Restatement. It gave birth to such an enormous body of case law that an entirely new Restatement of Torts, Third: Products Liability was published in 1997 to supersede Section 402A and related sections.

See also
Restatements of the Law

References

Tort law
Legal treatises